Dmytro Osadchyi may refer to:
 Dmytro Anatoliyovych Osadchyi (born 1992), Ukrainian footballer
 Dmytro Serhiyovych Osadchyi (born 1992), Ukrainian-Israeli footballer